The 1999 Northwest Territories general election was held on December 6, 1999. This was the first election under the new boundaries that were created when Nunavut was carved out of the Northwest Territories. 19 members were elected, five fewer than in the previous election.

The main issues in this election were Native self-government and control over the territory's resources.

On polling day, Yellowknife was caught in an extreme blizzard that cut off-road traffic and supplies.

This was also the last election in Canada in the 20th century.

The election was conducted under a non-partisan rules as the government operates under consensus, and Elections N.W.T. has not recognized parties since 1905. The Western Arctic New Democratic Party, a quasi-official offshoot of the New Democratic Party of Canada, fielded candidates and published signs and campaign material, as an attempt to revive a partisan legislature. They were shut out of the election.

Members of the Legislative Assembly elected
For complete electoral history, see individual districts

See also
1999 Nunavut general election

External links
CBC clip profiling the 1999 election
1999 election results district by district

Elections in the Northwest Territories
1999 elections in Canada
December 1999 events in Canada
1999 in the Northwest Territories